Germán Horacio Robles San Agustín (March 20, 1929 – November 21, 2015) was a Spanish actor who came to Mexico when he was 17, after Spain's civil war.

In Mexican cinema, he is best known for his amazing characterization of vampires in many cult movies, especially in El Vampiro. He is said to have influenced Christopher Lee’s performance in his vampire films. Another well known performance is his dubbing the voice of KITT in the Latin American broadcast of Knight Rider.

Family 
Germán was son of the painter Germán Horacio and the grandchild of Pachín de Melás.

He married Ana María Vásquez.

Filmography
Dr. Tom Horton Sr. in Dias de Nuestras Vidas (1965-1994) (voiceover for Macdonald Carey)
Henry Blake in M*A*S*H* (1970) (voiceover for Roger Bowen)
KITT in El Auto Fantástico (1982-1986)
Dr. Peter Silberman in Terminator (1984) (voiceover for Earl Boen)
Henry Blake in M*A*S*H* (1984-1987) (voiceover for McLean Stevenson)
Professor Embry in Robotech: La Película (1986)
Sherman T. Potter in M*A*S*H* (1987-1995) (voiceover for Harry Morgan)
Dr. Peter Silberman in Terminator 2: El Juicio Final (1991) (voiceover for Earl Boen)
Velarmino in Amor de nadie (1990)
Lionel Racer in Meteoro (1993-1994)
Lionel Racer in Meteoro: La Película (1993)
M. Bison in Street Fighter II V (1994-1995)
Sherman T. Potter in AfterMASH (1995-1997) (voiceover for Harry Morgan)
Capitan Galimos in Dangaioh (1996)
Rasputin in Anastasia (1997) (voiceover for Christopher Lloyd)
Manny in A Bug's Life (1998) (voiceover for Jonathan Harris)
General Grievous in Star Wars: Clone Wars (2003-2004) 
 Dr. Peter Silberman in Terminator 3: La Rebelión de las Máquinas (2003) (voiceover for Earl Boen)
General Grievous in Star Wars: Episode III – Revenge of the Sith (2005) (voiceover for Matthew Wood)
Krayzie Bone in Montar Sucio (2006)
Davy Jones in Piratas del Caribe 2: El Cofre de la Muerte (2006) (voiceover for Bill Nighy)
Davy Jones in Pirates of the Caribbean: At World's End (2007) (voiceover for Bill Nighy)
Anton Ego in Ratatouille (2007) (voiceover for Peter O'Toole)

References

External links

1929 births
2015 deaths
Chespirito actors
Mexican male film actors
Mexican male stage actors
Mexican male television actors
Mexican male voice actors
Mexican people of Asturian descent
People from Gijón
Spanish emigrants to Mexico